A four-part referendum was held in Switzerland on 11 May 1884. All four were rejected by voters.

Background
All four referendums were optional referendums, which meant that only a majority of the public vote was required for the proposals to be approved, as opposed to a mandatory referendum which required both a majority of voters and cantons.

Results

Question I
Question I asked whether a federal law on the organisation of the federal departments for justice and the police should be enacted.

Question II
Question II asked voters whether they approved of a federal resolution on patent taxes for salesmen.

Question III
Question III asked voters whether they approved of an amendment to the federal criminal law made on 4 February 1853.

Question IV
Question IV asked voters whether they approved of a federal resolution on a 10,000 CHF contribution to the cost of the Swiss embassy in Washington, D.C.

References

1884 referendums
1884 in Switzerland
Referendums in Switzerland